Jason Bateman is an American actor, director and producer. The following are his roles in film, television and video games.

Film

Television

Video games

Music videos

References

American filmographies
Male actor filmographies